Eva Kant is an Italian comics character who originated in the series Diabolik, issue #3 (3 March 1963).

The character is extremely popular in Italy, where she reached the status of fashion icon.

Fictional character biography
Eva is the girlfriend and sidekick of criminal mastermind Diabolik, and just like him she is a master of disguises. Eva is portrayed as an attractive blonde young woman; she drives a black E-Type Jaguar, and usually goes into action wearing a heavy sweater and trousers, no mask and no revealing clothing. She usually wears her hair up.

Appearances in other media

Animated series
Eva appeared  in the 1999 Diabolik animated television series. Her voice was provided by Sonia Mazza in Italian and by Megan Fahlenbock in English.

Live-action films
In the 1968 movie adaptation Danger: Diabolik by Mario Bava, Eva is played by Marisa Mell, and in general wears more revealing clothing than her usual comic costume. She also wears her long hair down, abandoning her trademark hairstyle.

She is played by actress Miriam Leone in the 2021 film directed by the Manetti Bros.

Music videos and tributes
In the Tiromancino's music video "Amore impossibile", directed by Lamberto Bava, Eva is played by Claudia Gerini.

In 2005, Eva is played by Roberta Potrich in the video for the 50th anniversary of the Fiat 600.

References

Italian comics characters
Female characters in comics
Fictional female martial artists
Comic book sidekicks
Comics characters introduced in 1963